Alexander Hessel (born 26 May 1988) is a German former professional footballer who plays as a centre-back.

Career
Hessel made his professional debut for Werder Bremen II in the 3. Liga on 9 August 2008, coming on as a substitute in the 78th minute for Niklas Andersen in the 4–3 home win against SV Sandhausen.

References

External links
 Profile at DFB.de
 Profile at kicker.de
 TuS Heeslingen statistics at Fussball.de
 Germania Egestorf/Langreder statistics at Fussball.de

1988 births
Living people
People from Mecklenburgische Seenplatte (district)
Footballers from Mecklenburg-Western Pomerania
People from Bezirk Neubrandenburg
German footballers
Germany youth international footballers
Association football central defenders
SV Werder Bremen II players
TuS Heeslingen players
FC Oberneuland players
3. Liga players
Regionalliga players
1. FC Germania Egestorf/Langreder players
1. FC Neubrandenburg 04 players